A zinc–bromine battery is a rechargeable battery system that uses the reaction between zinc metal and bromine to produce electric current, with an electrolyte composed of an aqueous solution of zinc bromide.  It is being developed as an alternative to lithium-ion batteries for stationary power applications, from domestic to grid-scale. The water-based electrolyte makes the battery system less prone to overheating and fire compared with lithium-ion battery systems.

Overview 
Zinc–bromine batteries can be split into two groups: flow batteries and non-flow batteries.

Redflow (Australia) and Primus Power (US) are active in commercialising zinc–bromine flow batteries, while Gelion (Australia) and EOS Energy Enterprises (US) are  developing and commercialising their non-flow zinc–bromine batteries.

Features of zinc–bromine battery chemistry 

Both flow and non-flow zinc–bromine batteries share six advantages over incumbent lithium-ion storage systems:

 100% depth of discharge capability on a daily basis.
 Little capacity degradation, enabling 5000+ cycles
 Low fire risk, since the electrolytes are non-flammable
 No need for cooling systems
 Use of low-cost and readily available battery materials
 Easy end-of-life recycling using existing processes

They also share four disadvantages:
 Lower energy density than Li-ion batteries
 Lower round-trip efficiency than Li-ion (although this is partially offset by the energy drawn from Li-ion installations to run cooling systems).
 The need to be fully discharged every few days to prevent zinc dendrites, which can puncture the separator.
 Lower charge and discharge rates than Li-ion

These features make zinc–bromine batteries unsuitable for many mobile applications (that typically require high charge discharge rates and low weight) but highly suitable for stationary energy storage applications such as daily cycling to support solar power generation, off-grid systems, and load shifting.

Zinc-bromine flow battery 
The zinc–bromine flow battery (ZBRFB) is a type of hybrid flow battery. A solution of zinc bromide is stored in two tanks. When the battery is charged or discharged, the solutions (electrolytes) are pumped through a reactor stack and back into the tanks. One tank is used to store the electrolyte for the positive electrode reactions, and the other for the negative. The energy densities of zinc–bromine flow batteries from different manufacturers range between 60 and 85 W·h/kg.

The predominantly aqueous electrolyte is composed of zinc bromide salt dissolved in water. During charge, metallic zinc is plated from the electrolyte solution onto the negative electrode (carbon felt in older designs, titanium mesh in modern) surfaces in the cell stacks. Bromide is converted to bromine at the positive electrode surface, to be stored in a safe, chemically complexed organic phase in the electrolyte tank. Older ZBRFB cells used polymer membranes (microporous polymers, Nafion etc.) More recent designs use no membrane.  The battery stack is typically made of carbon-filled plastic bipolar plates (e.g. 60 cells), and is enclosed into a high-density polyethylene (HDPE) container.
The zinc–bromine battery can be regarded as an electroplating machine. During charging, zinc is electroplated onto conductive electrodes, while at the same time bromine is formed. On discharge, the reverse process occurs: the metallic zinc plated on the negative electrodes dissolves in the electrolyte and is available to be plated again at the next charge cycle. It can be left fully discharged indefinitely without damage. There is no self-discharge in a fully charged state, when the stack is kept dry.

Features of zinc–bromine flow batteries

In addition to the general advantages of the chemistry, zinc–bromine flow batteries have two significant advantages: 
 They are scalable to large storage capacity through larger tanks and stacks, eg. Primus Power produces a 125 kWh unit and Redflow a 10 kWh unit.
Individual parts can be serviced or replaced – for example the pump, tanks, or electrolyte.

Zinc–bromine flow batteries also have specific disadvantages in their design:
 The need every 1–4 cycles to short the terminals across a low-impedance shunt while running the electrolyte pump, to fully remove zinc from battery plates.
 Low areal power (<0.2 W/cm2) during both charge and discharge, which translates into a high cost of power.
Low Round Trip Efficiency with Redflow claim DC–DC efficiency of up to 80% for their ZBM3 battery and Primus Power just 70%. This is significantly lower than Li-ion batteries, which are typically 90% or more.
Low energy-density (Redflow ZBM3 42 Wh/kg)
Complex construction with moving parts

Zinc–bromine flow battery developers include:
 Primus Power – Hayward, California, a privately held US company.
 RedFlow Limited – Brisbane, Australia, a publicly listed company on the ASX. 
 Smart Energy – Shanghai, China.
 EnSync (Formerly ZBB) – Menomonee Falls, Wisconsin, US (they have since become insolvent and no longer operate).
 ZBEST Power – Beijing, China.

Zinc–bromine non-flow batteries
Zinc–bromine non-flow battery providers include:

 Gelion Technologies – Sydney
 EOS Energy Enterprises – Edison, New Jersey

Gelion gel zinc–bromine battery 
A development by Thomas Maschmeyer at the University of Sydney replaces the liquid with a gel. Gel is neither liquid nor solid, but has the advantages of both. Ions can move more quickly, decreasing charging time. It is more efficient, longer-lasting, and cheaper than lithium, and the gel is fire-retardant. , Gelion, launched as a University of Sydney spinoff company to develop the battery for commercial use. The company was boosted by an A$11 million investment from UK renewables group Armstrong Energy. Gelion raised further capital with an IPO and listed on the AIM London Stock Exchange 30 November 2021.

Gelion plans to use the funds to commercialise a 1.2 kWh monoblock battery for use in commercial and grid-scale applications.  Gelion claims its monoblocks will have four major advantages compared with zinc–bromine flow batteries:
 Significantly higher energy density of 120 Wh/kg
 Significantly higher round-trip efficiency (RTE >87%)
 Cheaper production, with no moving parts
 Easily scalable to gigawatt factory capacity by using existing lead–acid battery factories
, Gelion announced that it had signed an agreement with Acciona Energy to trial its Endure gel zinc–bromine batteries for grid-scale applications. The trial is due to start after July 2022 and run for 6–12 months.

EOS Energy Enterprise zinc-hybrid cathode battery 
, EOS are commercialising their Znyth® “zinc-hybrid cathode” battery.  This is a non-flow battery design that also uses zinc–bromine chemistry.

As of June 2022, EOS Energy's specifications of its Aurora(R) 150kW/600kWh battery system claims an RTE of 75–80% DC; a lifetime of 5000 cycles/15years; and an operating temperature range from −20 to 45oC.

Electrochemistry
Both flow and non-flow zinc–bromine batteries share the same electrochemistry.

At the negative electrode zinc is the electroactive species. Zinc has long been used as the negative electrode of primary cells. It is a widely available, relatively inexpensive metal, which is electropositive, with a standard reduction potential E° = −0.76 V vs SHE. But it is rather stable in contact with neutral and alkaline aqueous solutions. For this reason it is used today in zinc–carbon and alkaline primaries.

In zinc–bromine batteries the negative electrode reaction is the reversible dissolution/plating of zinc:
 Zn_{(s)} <=> {Zn^2+}_{(aq)} + 2e^-

At the positive electrode bromine is reversibly reduced to bromide (with a standard reduction potential of +1.087 V vs SHE):
 {Br2_{(aq)}} + 2e^- <=> {2Br^-}_{(aq)} 

So the overall cell reaction is
 {Zn_{(s)}} + Br2_{(aq)} <=> {2Br^-}_{(aq)} + {Zn^2+}_{(aq)}

The measured potential difference is around 1.67 V per cell (slightly less than that predicted from standard reduction potentials).

The two electrode chambers of each cell in both flow and non-flow designs are divided by a membrane (typically a microporous or ion-exchange variety). This helps to prevent bromine from reaching the negative electrode, where it would react with the zinc, causing the battery to self-discharge. To further reduce self-discharge and to reduce the vapor pressure of bromine, complexing agents are added to the positive electrolyte. These react reversibly with the bromine to form an oily red liquid and reduce the  concentration in the electrolyte.

Applications

Remote telecom sites
Significant diesel-generator fuel savings are possible at remote telecom sites operating under conditions of low electrical load and large installed generation by using multiple systems in parallel to maximise the benefits and minimise the drawbacks of the technology.

List of major applications and installations of zinc–bromine batteries 
 In December 2021 Redflow completed a 2 MWh installation for Aneargia to support a 2.0 MW biogas-fuelled cogeneration unit, and a microgrid control system in California.
  EOS Energy Enterprises has secured a 300 MWh order from Pine Gate Renewables, with installation planned for 2022.
 , Gelion announced that it had signed an agreement with Acciona Energy to trial Endure batteries for grid-scale application. The trial is due to start in July 2022 and run for 6–12 months.

See also
 Electrochemical engineering
 List of battery types

References

Further reading
 Bromine complexation in zinc–bromine circulating batteries D. J. Eustace, J. Electrochem. Soc. 127(3), 528–32 (1980)
 Handbook of batteries, 3rd edition. D. Linden, T. B. Reddy. 39.1–39.8 (2002)
  Update
 RedFlow.

External links
 ZnBr Batteries at the Electricity Storage Association

Battery types
Flow batteries